Gojeoksan is a mountain in Gangwon-do, South Korea. Its area extends across the cities of Donghae, Samcheok and the county of Jeongseon.

See also
 List of mountains in Korea

Notes

References
 

Mountains of South Korea
Mountains of Gangwon Province, South Korea
One-thousanders of South Korea
zh:高积山